Barton Peveril Sixth Form College is an Ofsted 'Outstanding' sixth form college located in Eastleigh, Hampshire, UK with approximately 4,800 students, aged 16-18. It is part of the Wessex Group of Sixth Form Colleges.

History
Originally Barton Peveril School was a temporary school, founded in 1904 by the local County Education Authority, to meet the demands of the new railway town of Eastleigh. It had two long-serving head teachers, with Miss Annie Smith at the reins from the start until her retirement in 1936 and then Mr Harry Newnham Reed Moore (1897–1991), who again only left to retire in 1963. He was succeeded by Mr R. E. Bowyer.

As the school expanded, larger premises were required, with a house named Barton Peveril purchased by 1918, which later gave its name to the institution officially recognised as Eastleigh County Secondary School, Barton Peveril. In 1932 there was another move, this time to a building in Desborough Road that had previously been used for a school, with the move marked by the name Eastleigh County High School. In 1957, the school moved to its current site and returned its original name of Barton Peveril School.

The last intake to the state coeducational grammar school was in 1972. Since 1973, only sixth form students have been enrolled.

The current principal is Rob Temple, preceded by Jonathan Prest who was principal from 2008 to 2022. Prest was preceded by Godfrey Glyn OBE who held the post from 1996 to 2008. Peter Happé was principal between 1980 and 1989.

Campus

The campus, comprising six buildings and a library, is situated in the south of Hampshire. The Chestnut, Hampshire, Mountbatten, Nobel, Rose, and Science Centre buildings each host a collection of the college’s academic qualifications.

The site is equidistant from Eastleigh and Southampton Airport Parkway railway stations, both of which are within walking distance.

In 2002 there was an £11.5 million building transformation project.

The Rose Building was constructed in 2006, at a cost of £7 million, to provide facilities for subjects including Sport, Media and the Performing Arts. Within this building is the Rose Theatre, which hosts a number of college and external events and productions.

The library underwent a £500,000 refurbishment in the summer of 2011, increasing the study space available and doubling the amount of computers. The library was renamed the Glyn Library, after previous Principal Godfrey Glyn OBE, and opened by the then Lord Lieutenant of Hampshire, Dame Mary Fagan.

In 2013 the Nobel Building was opened, offering facilities for Mathematics, Computer Science, Psychology, Criminology, Geography and Media; within this is a Media Studio and a Radio Studio.

The Science Centre was opened in 2015, costing £5 million. Each of the three floors is dedicated to a different scientific discipline: Chemistry, Biology, and Physics respectively. A £1.5 million extension to The Science Centre was opened in May 2019, which includes a new, dedicated Engineering lab.

Curriculum

The college has over 60 A Level and Vocational courses available, alongside a programme of enrichment activities called Q-XTRA. The college focuses on preparing students for life after college, including Higher Education, Apprenticeships or Employment.

As of 2018, most students select three A Levels (or the equivalent in Vocational courses) with an enrichment option; this may include the Extended Project Qualification, a sport, performing art, volunteering, work experience, or a further experience or qualification.

In October 2002, the college was given Beacon Status, an award that "celebrates learning providers that deliver outstanding teaching and learning".

In June 2019, the college won the Sixth Form Colleges' Association Award for Independent Learning, for enabling students of all levels to work effectively and independently.

In January 2020, Barton Peveril was shortlisted for the Tes FE Award for the Outstanding Use of Technology for Improving Teaching, Learning and Assessment Award.

Activities

In 2018, the college launched a new programme of enrichment activities called Q-XTRA, which offers students a comprehensive set of wider activities that allow for improvement in one of four areas: Health, Community, Skills, and Employability.

Multiple college productions take place throughout the year. Recent productions have included The Addams Family, Sister Act and a 1950s Immersive Theatre event where the college was transformed into an American High School from 1958.

Students can play Football, Hockey, Netball, Rugby, Basketball, Tennis and Badminton.

In 2019 Barton Peveril became Talented Athlete Scholarship Scheme (TASS) Accredited. The TASS Dual Career Accreditation Scheme, run by Sport England, ensures elite athletes can compete at the highest level whilst studying.

As well as the clubs and societies led by staff, students are encouraged to set up and run their own groups within the Q-XTRA programme. Examples of student run groups include the Gay Straight Alliance, the Christian Union and the Debating Society. A competition entry by the latter was praised by the BBC partially because "every part of the college's entry was entirely down to the students themselves".

The Barton Peveril Jazz Ensemble won their section of the National Festival of Music for Youth in 2009. Other ensembles (open to all college students) include a choir, soul band, string group, wind ensemble and flute choir. Other extra-curricular performing arts opportunities include shows, for example in 2012 the musical West Side Story, and the annual Rock Challenge dance competition.

Barton Peveril students host a radio show every Wednesday from 2-3pm on Unity 101, from the start of the academic year in September until Easter.

Lockdown on 9th of March 2023 
At around 14:20 on the 9th of March 2023 the campus was put into lockdown after reports of a group of armed individuals where seen on site.

College principal Rob Temple said: "We followed our lockdown procedures as we were warned there was an intruder carrying a weapon on the college site.

Later, Hampshire Police Constabulary said that no injuries had been reported and no weapon had been located. On the 10th of March BBC news reported that three boys had been found with minor injuries

Alumni
 Chris Draper, olympic sailor
 Tom Deacon, comedian
 Wade Elliott, footballer
 James Foad, rower: Men's eight 2012 Olympics bronze medallist
 Colin Firth, Oscar-Winning actor
 Dani King, cyclist: Women's team pursuit 2012 Olympics gold medallist and world record holder
 Kevin Latouf, cricketer
 David Nicholls, writer
 Elio Pace, musician
 Melanie Purkiss, athlete
William Doyle, musician
Kai Widdrington, choreographer and Strictly Come Dancing professional

Barton Peveril Grammar School
 Andrew Ball, pianist.
 David Campbell, clarinetist, 1964–71
 Rev Paul Flowers, former chairman of the Co-op bank
Jane Parker-Smith (1950-2020), organist
 John Sweeney, BBC journalist
 Bill Woodrow, sculptor

References

External links 
 Barton Peveril website

Further education colleges in Hampshire
Learning and Skills Beacons
Sixth form colleges in Hampshire
Eastleigh